Zaur Umarovich Sadayev (born 6 November 1989) is a Russian football player of Chechen origin.

Club career
He made his debut with FC Terek Grozny in the Russian Premier League in 2008.

On 30 January 2013, he was transferred to the Israeli Beitar Jerusalem along with Dzhabrail Kadiyev, both Muslims. On 3 March, Sadayev scored his first goal for Beitar during a league game against Maccabi Netanya, prompting hundreds of the team's fans to leave the stadium. Also it was his first and last goal for Beitar Jerusalem. So he made 7 appearances and scored 1 goal.

On 31 January 2019, he joined Turkish club Ankaragücü on loan until the end of the 2018–19 season. On 16 July 2019, he returned to Ankaragücü, signing a one-year contract. He left the club in March 2020.

In August 2021, Sadayev joined Russian club FC Aluston-YBK.

Career statistics

Honours

Club
Lech Poznań
 Ekstraklasa: 2014–15

References

External links
 
 Profile on the FC Terek Grozny site 
 
 

1989 births
People from Shalinsky District, Chechen Republic
Living people
Russian footballers
Russian expatriate footballers
Association football forwards
Russia youth international footballers
Russia national football B team footballers
FC Akhmat Grozny players
Russian people of Chechen descent
Chechen people
Beitar Jerusalem F.C. players
Lechia Gdańsk players
Lech Poznań players
MKE Ankaragücü footballers
Russian Premier League players
Israeli Premier League players
Ekstraklasa players
Süper Lig players
Expatriate footballers in Israel
Expatriate footballers in Poland
Expatriate footballers in Turkey
Russian expatriate sportspeople in Israel
Russian expatriate sportspeople in Poland
Russian expatriate sportspeople in Turkey
Russian Muslims
Sportspeople from Chechnya